Wagneripteryx is a genus of true bugs belonging to the family Cicadellidae.

 Wagneripteryx germari

References

Cicadellidae
Hemiptera genera